Jalan Arsat, Federal Route 731, is a major federal roads in Federal Territory of Labuan, Malaysia.

Features

At most sections, the Federal Route 731 was built under the JKR R5 road standard, with a speed limit of 90 km/h.

List of junctions and town

References

Malaysian Federal Roads
Roads in Labuan